Giuseppe Boghetti (1896 - July 1941) was an American voice teacher and tenor. He was the teacher of several famous American opera singers, including Marian Anderson, Edythe Johnson, Jan Peerce, Blanche Thebom, and Helen Traubel.

Life and career
Born with the name Joe Bogash to Russian-Jewish parents in Philadelphia, Boghetti was trained at the Milan Conservatory. It was while in Italy that he changed his name to something that sounded Italian in the hopes that it would help bolster his career. He appeared as a concert tenor in several European cities but was never able to gain enough momentum to make a full-time living as a singer. He accordingly returned to the United States in 1918 where he opened studios in both his native city and New York City. He continued to teach in both cities up until his death in 1941.

In 1919, at the age of 23, Boghetti began teaching the great American contralto Marian Anderson. He remained Anderson's teacher, trusted advisor and friend up until his death 22 years later.

References

1896 births
1941 deaths
Voice teachers
American people of Russian-Jewish descent
Jews and Judaism in Philadelphia
People from Philadelphia
American expatriates in Italy